Bloomingdale (literally blooming valley or valley of flowers) may refer to:

People 
 Bloomingdale (surname)

Places 
Canada
 Bloomingdale, Ontario

United States
 Bloomingdale, former name of Oregon City, California
 Bloomingdale, Florida 
 Bloomingdale, Georgia 
 Bloomingdale, Illinois 
 Bloomingdale, Indiana 
 Bloomingdale, Kentucky 
 Bloomingdale (Queenstown, Maryland), listed on the NRHP in Maryland
 Bloomingdale, Michigan
 Bloomingdale, New Jersey
 Bloomingdale, New York (Essex County)
 Bloomingdale, North Carolina 
 Bloomingdale, Ohio 
 Bloomingdale, South Dakota 
 Bloomingdale, Tennessee 
 Bloomingdale (Washington, DC), a neighborhood in Washington, D.C.
 Bloomingdale, Wisconsin
 Bloomingdale School of Music, a nonprofit community music school in Manhattan, New York City
 Bloomingdale District, a district of Manhattan
 Bloomingdale Township (disambiguation)

Other 
 Bloomingdale, a beachclub in Bloemendaal aan Zee, The Netherlands
 Bloomingdale's, a department store chain owned by Federated Department Stores
 Bloomingdale Insane Asylum, the first mental health facility to open in New York state in 1821
 Bloomingdale High School, located near Bloomingdale, Florida in Valrico, Florida
 Bloomingdale Line, an elevated rail line in Chicago